Totems Flare is the fifth studio album by electronic musician Chris Clark and the third one under the moniker Clark. It was released on 13 July 2009 by Warp.

Track listing

References

External links
 Warp Records album page

 

2009 albums
Clark (musician) albums
Warp (record label) albums